Prostephanus is a genus of horned powder-post beetles in the family Bostrichidae. There are about five described species in Prostephanus.

Species
These five species belong to the genus Prostephanus:
 Prostephanus apax Lesne, 1930
 Prostephanus arizonicus Fisher, 1950
 Prostephanus punctatus (Say, 1826)
 Prostephanus sulcicollis (Fairmaire & Germain, 1861)
 Prostephanus truncatus (Horn, 1878) (larger grain borer)

References

Further reading

External links

 

Bostrichidae
Articles created by Qbugbot